Dominik Tejnor (born January 28, 1994) is a Czech professional ice hockey defenceman. He currently plays with Piráti Chomutov in the Czech Extraliga.

Tejnor made his Czech Extraliga debut playing with Piráti Chomutov debut during the 2013–14 Czech Extraliga season.

References

External links

1994 births
Living people
Czech ice hockey defencemen
Piráti Chomutov players
Sportovní Klub Kadaň players
SK Horácká Slavia Třebíč players
Ice hockey people from Prague